Ira Albright (January 2, 1959 – July 2, 2020) was a gridiron football running back and defensive tackle. After attending South Oak Cliff High School, Albright played college football at Tyler Junior College and for the Northeastern State Riverhawks. In 1983, he played for the Michigan Panthers of the United States Football League (USFL) as a nose guard. The Pittsburgh Maulers converted Albright to a fullback in 1984, thinking he was too small to be effective on the defense. In 1986, Albright played in one regular season game with the Montreal Alouettes.

References

External links 
Ira Albright on Just Sports Stats

1959 births
2020 deaths
Northeastern State RiverHawks football players
Tyler Apaches football players
Michigan Panthers players
Pittsburgh Maulers players
Montreal Alouettes players
Buffalo Bills players
American football defensive tackles
American football fullbacks
Canadian football running backs
Players of American football from Dallas
Players of Canadian football from Dallas